Cirsosina is a genus of fungi in the Microthyriaceae family; according to the 2007 Outline of Ascomycota, the placement in this family is uncertain.

Species
As accepted by Species Fungorum;
 Cirsosina calami 
 Cirsosina rhododendri

References

External links
Index Fungorum

Microthyriales